Bergiaria platana is a species of long-whiskered catfish endemic to Argentina where it occurs in the Paraná River basin.  This species grows to a length of  SL.

References
 

Pimelodidae
Fish of South America
Fish of Argentina
Endemic fauna of Argentina
Taxa named by Franz Steindachner
Fish described in 1908